Sonika Tandi (born 20 March 1997) is an Indian field hockey player who plays as a midfielder for the Indian national team.

She was part of the Indian squad at the 2017 Women's Hockey Asia Cup which won the gold medal.

References

External links

Sonika at Hockey India

1997 births
Living people
Indian female field hockey players
Female field hockey midfielders
People from Hisar district
Field hockey players from Haryana
Sportswomen from Haryana
Field hockey players at the 2022 Commonwealth Games
Commonwealth Games bronze medallists for India
Commonwealth Games medallists in field hockey
South Asian Games gold medalists for India
South Asian Games medalists in field hockey
Medallists at the 2022 Commonwealth Games